"Cry Wolf" is a song by American singer Laura Branigan, released as the third and final single from her fifth studio album, Touch (1987). It was written by singer-songwriter Jude Johnstone, who later recorded the song herself for her 2002 debut album. Stevie Nicks recorded a cover in 1989 for her fourth solo studio album, The Other Side of the Mirror.

Track listings

Credits and personnel
Credits adapted from the liner notes of Touch.

 Laura Branigan – vocals
 David Kershenbaum – production
 Bob Marlette – arrangements, keyboards, guitars, string arrangements, drum programming
 Carlos Vega – drums
 John Nelson – guitars
 Kim Scharnberg – string arrangements, conducting
 Kenneth G. Kugler – copyist
 Julie Ann Gigante, Ralph D. Morrison III, Clayton Haslop, Alexander Horvath, R.F. Peterson, Arthur Zadinsky, Michael Nowak, Raymond J. Tischer II, Margot MacLaine, Armen Ksjikian, Dennis Karmazyn, Michael Matthews – strings
 David J. Holman – engineering, mixing, PPG programming

Charts

Cover versions
 1989: Stevie Nicks was the first to cover the song and it was featured on her album The Other Side of the Mirror.
 1992: Anne Haigis covered the song as the title track to her eighth studio album.
 2002: Jude Johnstone, the writer of the song, recorded it herself for her debut album Coming of Age.

References

1987 songs
1988 singles
Atlantic Records singles
Laura Branigan songs
Song recordings produced by David Kershenbaum
Songs written by Jude Johnstone
Stevie Nicks songs